Claus Ryskjær (26 June 1945 – 12 December 2016) was a Danish actor active from 1966 to 2008.

Selected filmography
Fun in the Streets (1969)
The Egborg Girl (1969)
The Olsen Gang's Big Score (1972)
Nu går den på Dagmar (1972)
Robin Hood (1973; Danish dub)
Huset på Christianshavn (1973–77; television)
Familien Gyldenkål (1975)
Jeppe på bjerget (1981)
The Olsen Gang Long Gone (1981)
The Fox and the Hound (1981; Danish dub)
Peter No-Tail (1981; Danish dub)
Valhalla (1986)
Oliver & Company (1988; Danish dub)
War of the Birds (1990)
The Olsen Gang's Last Trick (1998)
Olsen-banden Junior (2001)

References

External links

1945 births
2016 deaths
Danish male film actors
Danish male voice actors
20th-century Danish male actors
21st-century Danish male actors
Danish male stage actors
People from Frederiksberg